Sujit K Sahu is an Indian statistician who is a Professor of Statistics, Mathematics and S3RI at the University of Southampton. Professor Sujit Sahu research makes significant contribution to practical Bayesian modelling.

Early life and education 
Sujit K Sahu received a BSc in statistics from Presidency College, University of Calcutta (1984-1989) and a Master of Statistics from the Indian Statistical Institute, Calcutta (1987-1989).

He has a PhD in statistics from the University of Connecticut and previously worked at the University of Cambridge (1994-1996) and Cardiff University (1997-1999) before joining the University of Southampton in 1999.

Current work 
Sujit Sahu currently is involved on an EPSRC funded research project with Dr Duncan Lee, Glasgow University and the Met Office to develop methodology in both air pollution and health outcome data modelling and their integration. In addition, Sahu works as co-investigator on NERC funded research grant to develop statistical models to study nutrient dynamics in annual and seasonal periods.

Professor Sujit Sahu has collaborated on methodological spatial statistics projects with Professor Alan Gelfand, Duke University and Dr David Holland, US Environmental Protection Agency.

He has also worked on an EPSRC funded (2010-2012), cross-disciplinary research project titled "MetSim: A Hospital Simulation Support Tool"  with Prof Paul Harper, Cardiff University, the Met Office, and the Southampton University Hospital Trust. His statistical work as part of this project included a Bayesian model for forecasting the number of hospital admissions and is being currently piloted by the Met Office for use by several UK hospitals.

Publications 
His full list of google citations can be found here  .

References

Indian statisticians
Academics of the University of Southampton
Living people
Year of birth missing (living people)